Adam Rowntree (born 18 April 1989) is an English footballer, who played three times in the Football League for Boston United.

He joined Boston United in January 2007, making his league debut as a late substitute in the 0–0 draw away to Wycombe Wanderers on 23 March 2007. He made two further appearances, both as substitute, in the league games away to Notts County and Hereford United.

He joined Blyth Spartans in 2008, making his debut against Redditch United on 18 October 2008. He played once more for Blyth, scoring against Gateshead three days later. He next joined Newcastle Benfield Bay Plastics.

References

External links

1989 births
Living people
English footballers
Association football forwards
Wallsend Boys Club players
Boston United F.C. players
Brigg Town F.C. players
Blyth Spartans A.F.C. players
Newcastle Benfield F.C. players
Chester-le-Street Town F.C. players
Ryton & Crawcrook Albion F.C. players
North Shields F.C. players
Heaton Stannington F.C. players
English Football League players